Huallanca (Hispanicized spelling) or Wallanka (Quechua for "mountain range") may refer to the following:

Huallanca District, Bolognesi - a district in the Bolognesi Province of the Ancash Region in Peru
Huallanca District, Huaylas - a district in the Huaylas Province of the Ancash Region in Peru
Huallanca (Ayacucho) - a town in the Ayacucho Region in Peru
Huallanca (Huánuco) - a town in the Huánuco Region in Peru
Wallanka - a mountain in the Ancash Region in Peru
Wallanka mountain range - one part of the Cordillera Occidental in the Andes mountain range in western Peru
Río Huallanca - headwaters of Marañón River (Peru)